Device is the fourth and final studio album released by Eon on August 1, 2006 through Fiberlineaudio.com.

Track listing

References

2006 albums
Eon (musician) albums